Light Me Up is a 2010 album by the Pretty Reckless.

Light Me Up also may refer to:

Albums
Lite Me Up, an album (and a track) by Herbie Hancock (2013)
Light Me Up, an album by Bronze Radio Return (2015)

Songs
 "Light Me Up" (Birdy song), 2015
 "Light Me Up" (Gromee song), a song by Polish music producer Gromee 
 "Light Me Up" (Hunter Hayes song), 2013
 "Light Me Up", by Kristian Bush, from Southern Gravity, 2015
 "Light Me Up", by Godley and Creme, from The History Mix Volume 1, 1985
 "Light Me Up", by Icona Pop, from This Is... Icona Pop, 2013
 "Light Me Up", by South Korean pop group Red Velvet from their second extended play, The Velvet

See also  
 "Light My Fire", a song by the American rock band the Doors